Ma Wara' al-Tabi'a, which can be translated also as Metaphysics, Supernatural, or Paranormal is the title of a series of horror/thriller novels written by Ahmed Khaled Towfik. As of 2014, 81 novels were published. Set in the 1960s, it sees hematologist Dr. Refaat Ismail unwillingly become a go-to guy for paranormal investigations. A Netflix series, Paranormal, was released on 5 November, 2020.

Storyline 
The stories are narratives, told in first person view, where the protagonist, Refaat (رفعت), is nearing seventy years of age and is narrating his adventures starting when he was in his late thirties. All of the events are related to the metaphysics in a way or another, and most often are caused by supernatural phenomena, although some are caused by culprits who are faking the events. Refaat usually solves the mystery, and always gets out alive whether or not he has fully understood the phenomenon. He is accompanied by many friends and characters throughout the stories, some stories are more centered around them than him, and some are totally narrated by them.

Style 
The stories are noted for the character's sarcastic attitude towards almost everything in life, although he is kind-hearted inside. He usually disbelieves everything until it's proven, and rarely pretends to be smart, as he always thinks that there is nothing that he could do about problems.
The writer's style is always renewed, with more than once the story told through newspaper clippings and retellings by other characters, who are given each a distinct point of view and different telling of the story. One very good example of this is #7 (Ostorat allahab alazrak), The Legend of the Blue Flame, where each character is telling a part of the story in a distinctive style. One thing relates them all, however, which is the sarcasm, a characteristic of the writer that does not change with any line of stories he writes.

Characters 
 Refaat Ismael: The permanent protagonist of the series, even though he is sometimes absent through a few.
 Ezzat: Refaat's neighbor whom he met in the 3rd story, he was thought to be a cannibal but he turned out to be innocent. Ezzat is a sculptor, a little famous in Egypt, loves Alexandria and is awake all night. He has Addison's disease which weakens his health and shape.
 Maggie MacCaleb: She is Refaat's first love, she is the daughter of Refaat's Scottish professor, Sir James McCaleb, she studies physics
 Adel and Seham. Adel is his school friend who now works in national security, he is ill-tempered and almost always busy and asked for Refaat's help in metaphysics/related security problems, he has witnessed some of those phenomenons but still finds them hoaxes and never believes Refaat. He lives in Alexandria and is married to Seham who introduced him to Howaida.
 Salem and Salma. Salem and Salma are the same person, only from alternate realities. They are married, a fact that Salma has commented made them "practically amoebas" and have travelled through different realities before meeting Refaat and telling him their stories before moving on to another reality.
 Howaida: She was Refaat's somewhat-ignorant fiancée who broke up with him later. She always pretended to be fragile and feminine while she was only dumb. She later married a man who appeared with her, pregnant, in "The Legend of the End of the Night".
 Dr. Ramzy: An Egyptology professor who knows all about the pharaohs and appeared in "The Legend of the Pharaoh's Curse", "The Horror Circle", "The Boring Legend", "The Legend of the Mummy" and "The Alphabet" (Special Editions).
 Dr. Samy: Refaat's psychologist friend who was the host of many creepy stories in his haunted villa, until he sold it and after that he only participated in "The Legend of the Ghoul Club". Has a lovely wife who is so sociable and always invites Refaat to the social events she hosts.
 Dr. Camilia: A philosopher Refaat first met in book 21, it was a replica of her but he finally met her after that and they became friends. She's participated in a different legend and some others.
 Harry Sheldon: Refaat's reckless American friend who is always ready to fight. He has a wife, Linda and has been with Refaat almost every time he went to the US, famous stories he took part in "The Legend of the Blue Flame" and "The Legend of the Doll".
 Sam Colby: who's not his friend but an acquaintance. He is a Jewish-American con-artist and affects magical knowledge though he has none.
 Dr. Lucifer: Is Refaat's main rival. Characterized by prominent eyebrows, his tall frame, neat black clothing and heavy gold jewellery. Initially depicted as a Hungarian paranormals expert, but later appears to be more than that. He has successfully deceived Refaat on several occasions and had the chance to destroy him, but has refrained from doing so and even saved him on occasion because as he said it was more entertaining to let him live. He has considerable clout with otherworldly creatures, possesses telepathic abilities and is heavily implied to be the devil.

Adaptations

In May 2020, Netflix released series 1 of the original Middle Eastern series based on Ma Waraa Al Tabiaa. The series was produced by Mohamed Hefzy and Amr Salama, who is also the showrunner and the director.

Bibliography
Include:

Horror circles 
Each nine books, the tenth is made in a special episodic way called the horror circle. The horror circles are groups of short stories narrated by different characters (exception #60, The black museum) and are related by a common motif. As of June 2007, they were:
 10. The Horror Circle. Refaat is at a social function at an affluent and sophisticated colleague, weather conditions prevent them from returning home, so they pass the night away in telling horror stories of their own life.
 20. Tales of The Tarot. While in a New York occultists' society party, Refaat is invited to a tarot reading session where a Hungarian paranormals expert does a tarot reading for those in attendance.
 30. After Midnight. Episodes from a short-lived paranormals-oriented late-night radio program that Reefat was the host of.
 40. Behind the Closed Door. Reefat spends New Year's Eve at an affluent colleague's house, though his colleague seems to be running late. It later transpires that his colleague has departed to the United States to seek treatment for a terminal illness, and he has rigged all exits but one so that opening it would spell death, the purpose of which was to express his distaste for the people he disliked the most, his very guests, whom he accuses of shortcomings such pretension and lack of integrity, with the only exception of Refaat, whom he invited because he thought he'd enjoy the experience. Knowing that help would come by morning in the form of a routine police visit, the guests spend the night telling their stories dealing with the subject of closed doors and what lies beyond them.
 50. Besides the Stars. While travelling alone by car on a cold night far away from home, Refaat seeks refuge in an abandoned house. He later wakes up to find himself in an alternate dimension where other confused individuals await before a number of demons, having arrived there through a trans-dimensional portal. The demons proclaim that those before them are each evil in some way, and announce that all will be banished to hell, with the exception of he who could prove to be the evilest of all.
 60. The Black Museum. An eccentric collector invites Refaat to view his collection of artifacts, each related to a paranormal incident.
 70. The Lost Episodes. Similar to #30.

See also 

 List of titles of Ma Waraa Al Tabiaa series
 Rewayat

Novel series
Arabic-language novels

References